Boston University School of Theology (STH) is the oldest theological seminary of American Methodism and the founding school of Boston University, the largest private research university in New England.  It is one of thirteen theological schools maintained by the United Methodist Church.  BUSTH is a member of the Boston Theological Institute consortium.

History
On April 24–25, 1839 a group of Methodist ministers and laymen met at the Old Bromfield Street Church in Boston and elected to establish a Methodist theological school. Following that vote, Osmon C. Baker, director of the Newbury Seminary, a high school and literary institution in Newbury, Vermont, started a biblical studies program at the seminary in 1840.  It was named the Newbury Biblical Institute.

In 1847 a Congregational Society in Concord, New Hampshire, invited the Institute to relocate to Concord and made available a disused Congregational church building with a capacity of 1200 people. Other citizens of Concord covered the remodeling costs. One stipulation of the invitation was that the Institute remain in Concord for at least 20 years. The charter issued by New Hampshire designated the school the "Methodist General Biblical Institute," but it was commonly called the "Concord Biblical Institute."  The school graduated its first class in 1850.

With the agreed twenty years coming to a close, the Trustees of the Concord Biblical Institute purchased  on Aspinwall Hill in Brookline, Massachusetts as a possible relocation site. The Institute moved in 1867 to 23 Pinkney Street in Boston and received a Massachusetts Charter as the "Boston Theological Institute."

In 1869, three Trustees of the Boston Theological Institute obtained from the Massachusetts Legislature a charter for a university by name of "Boston University." These three were successful Boston businessmen and Methodist laymen, with a history of involvement in educational enterprises and became the Founders of Boston University. In 1871, the Boston Theological Institute was incorporated into Boston University as its first professional school, the Boston University School of Theology.

Over the course of its history, the Boston University School of Theology played a central role in the development of the fields of philosophical theology (e.g. Boston Personalism), social ethics, missions and ecumenism, and pastoral psychology. Because of its roots in the egalitarianism of nineteenth-century Methodism, from its beginning the school admitted women and African-Americans for all degree programs. In 1880, Anna Howard Shaw, the second woman to graduate from the school, became the first woman ordained Elder in the Methodist Protestant Church, one of the forerunners of the United Methodist Church.  As late as the 1960s, the vast majority of African-Americans with doctorates in religion were trained at Boston University. A study in 1983 showed that the largest number of doctoral dissertations in mission studies had been produced at Boston University.

Centers and institutes

The following centers and institutes are affiliated with Boston University School of Theology:
The Anna Howard Shaw Center: Director, Dr. Choi, Hee An
The Center for Global Christianity and Mission: Director, Dr. Dana Robert 
The Center for Practical Theology: Co-Directors, Dr. Bryan Stone and Dr. Claire Wolfteich
The Tom Porter Religion and Conflict Transformation Program: Dr. James McCarty

Programs
The Boston University School of Theology includes several special academic programs, including one of only seven Master of Sacred Music (MSM) programs in the United States. The academic degrees offered are as follows:

First-level masters:
 Master of Divinity (M.Div.) - six semesters.
 Master of Theological Studies (MTS) - four semesters.
 Master of Sacred Music (MSM) - four semesters.

Second-level masters:
 Master of Sacred Theology (STM) - two semesters.  (The STM in Military Chaplaincy was recently introduced, with a concentration in either Religion and Conflict Transformation or Trauma Healing.)

Doctoral:
 Doctor of Ministry (D.Min.)
 Doctor of Philosophy (Ph.D.) - in Practical Theology
 Doctor of Theology (Th.D.)- On December 18, 2013, Boston University approved the proposal of the faculty of the School of Theology to convert its Th.D. (Doctor of Theology) degree to a Ph.D. (Doctor of Philosophy) degree effective January 1, 2014.

Additionally, the following degree programs are available within the School of Theology and in conjunction with the Boston University School of Social Work:

 M.Div./Master of Social Work (MSW)
 MTS/MSW
 M.Div./MSM

The Ph.D. programs offered through the Division of Religious and Theological Studies (DRTS) at Boston University's Graduate School of Arts and Sciences share many students and faculty with the School of Theology.

Academics
While the school has extremely strong faculty in all of these areas, BUSTH has a particularly strong reputation in several academic areas.  These include religion and science; missiology and World Christianity; theology and philosophy; religion and conflict transformation; social and environmental ethics; and religion and counseling.

The Boston University School of Theology is a member of the Boston Theological Institute.  Students at any of the eight member schools may enroll in classes at any other school.

Notable faculty
This faculty information is current as of Summer 2022:
 Bryan P. Stone
 Wesley J. Wildman
 Dana L. Robert

Notable alumni

Prominent alumni of BUSTH include the following (arranged alphabetically):

 George Lincoln Blackwell, theologian and author
 Samuel Logan Brengle, Salvation Army theologian
 Cornell William Brooks, lawyer, activist and president of the NAACP
 Rev. Dr. Steven W. Brown, Homiletics professor and nationally syndicated broadcaster
 Chai-Sik Chung, social ethicist and sociologist of religion
 Ralph Edward Dodge, a Bishop of the Methodist Church in Rhodesia;
 Peter Deunov, Bulgarian theologian, spiritual leader and author
 Dr. James L. Farmer, Sr., first African-American from Texas to earn a doctorate
 George L. Fox, one of the four chaplains on the USAT Dorchester in WWII
 Catherine Gunsalus Gonzalez, author and Professor Emerita at Columbia Theological Seminary
 Dr. Georgia Harkness, Methodist theologian
 Dr. Carl F. H. Henry, theologian
 S. Clifton Ives, a Bishop of the United Methodist Church 
 Martin Luther King Jr., BUSTH Ph.D., minister, civil rights activist and Nobel Peace Prize laureate
 James Lawson, activist, professor, and leading theoretician of nonviolence within the civil rights movement 
 Henry M. Loud, theologian and early lumber magnate
 Edgar Amos Love, a Bishop in the Methodist Episcopal Church and co-founder of Omega Psi Phi fraternity 
 Walter G. Muelder, ecumenical leader, theorist of the "responsible society," and shaper of Christian social ethics
 Garfield Bromley Oxnam, a Bishop of the Methodist Episcopal Church 
 Dr. Norman Vincent Peale, positive thinker and founder of Guideposts magazine
 Samuel DeWitt Proctor, famous African-American preacher and civil rights leader
 John Hudson Riddick, AME preacher
 Dallas Lore Sharp, minister, university professor, and author
 Dr. Anna Howard Shaw, a leader of the movement of women's suffrage in the United States 
 Katharine Lente Stevenson (1853–1919), temperance reformer, missionary, editor
 Woodie W. White, a Bishop of the United Methodist Church
 Rev Dr. J. Philip Wogaman, theologian, ethicist, professor, Dean, Wesley Theological Seminary, Senior Pastor Foundry Church
 Dr. Amos Yong, Pentecostal theologian

Organizations and activities
BUSTH is host to a number of student groups and hosted organizations. All student groups operate within the Boston University Theological Students' Association (BUTSA), the school's student body government. Student groups include (arranged alphabetically):

 Association for Black Seminarians
 CAUSE: a group that promotes social and ecological justice
 Doctoral Student Association
 Sacred Worth: a student organization devoted to all individuals, regardless of gender or orientation
 Hispanic/Latino Student Association
 Korean Students Association
 MTS Club: weekly social group with an academic/philosophical interest in theology
 Seminary Singers: the service choir for Wednesday Chapel services
 Southern Fried Theologians
 : a group devoted to ecological justice and sustainability initiatives

See also
 Boston University
 Boston Theological Institute

Notes

External links
 Boston University School of Theology

 
Seminaries and theological colleges in Massachusetts
Educational institutions established in 1871
Theology
United Methodist seminaries
Universities and colleges affiliated with the United Methodist Church
University subdivisions in Massachusetts
1871 establishments in Massachusetts
Protestant seminaries and theological colleges
Universities and colleges affiliated with the Methodist Episcopal Church